"The Slowskys" are a national television advertising campaign for Comcast Cable's Xfinity broadband Internet service. The ads feature an animatronic turtle couple, Bill and Karolyn Slowsky. The ads are based on the idea that DSL, which Xfinity claims is slower than their service, is only fast enough for people who like things very slow. In the television ads, the two turtles are usually shown together explaining why they are so happy with DSL service, and that if they got Xfinity, it would be far too fast for them.

The characters were created by Goodby Silverstein & Partners of San Francisco, produced by RSA, puppeteered by Stan Winston. The campaign won the gold Effie Award in 2007.

TheSlowskys.com was a character blog on which everything slow is celebrated. Recently however, the blog was taken down and replaced by a peaceful, permanent flash widget that included their commercials.

A knockoff of The Slowskys by Canadian cable provider Shaw Communications is called The Snailskis.

Comedian Andrew Donnelly is the voice of Bill Slowsky and actress (and former member of The Groundlings) Rachael Harris provides the voice for Karolyn. Son Bill Slowsky, Jr. (featured in a reboot campaign starting in May 2019) is voiced by musician Lucas Grabeel.

When the Slowsky fad reached its peak, the Slowskys Website created a fictional campaign in which the Slowsky couple traveled around their block in an old fashioned political circuit. On top of their vehicle, multiple bullhorns would amplify the Slowsky's voices so that people could hear them. The advertising video showed the Slowskys in the vehicle, and with Bill screaming "BE STILL WITH BILL!", much to Karolyn's annoyance, with "Hail to the Chief" playing in the background. The party even offered membership cards and requested slogans for their platform.

In the 2019 ad series, Bill Jr. reveals that he is a big fan of the speed and convenience offered by Xfinity and its service-related smartphone app, leading to his father ending each ad with blunt dismissals (such as "I'll pass" and "I'd rather not") of his son's empassioned advocacy for added speed.

References

External links
Home page of The Slowskys (Recently Altered)
Embroidered Splash Screen (Original)

Advertising characters
Advertising campaigns
Fictional turtles
Internet memes
Politics in fiction
Animatronics
Male characters in advertising
Female characters in advertising